Micaela Lorena Viciconte (born 3 May 1989) better known as Mica Viciconte, is an Argentinian television personality, lifeguard, and athlete.

Viciconte was born in Mar del Plata, Buenos Aires Province, Argentina. She participated in and won some seasons of the reality show Combate Argentina. In 2017, She was a contestant on the dance competition Dancing for a Dream, where she reached the final stage. In 2018, she was a semi-finalist of the competition. She participated in other TV programs such as Todas las Tardes, Incorrectas, El Show Del Problema, It is in your hands, and more. In 2021, she started her own radio show "Show Attack" and participated and won the third season of Master Chef Celebrity Argentina.

Early life 
Viciconte studied to be a lifeguard in the Sindicato del Mar. While she was 18, she gave swimming lessons, among other jobs. After a period without work and a personal situation, she moved to Buenos Aires.

Career

Television 
In 2014, she debuted as a contestant on the physical competition show Combate, where she reached the finals and won the season as part of a team. In addition, the public chose her as "Absolute Champion", taking an extra prize of 100,000 Argentine pesos. She later agreed to participate in the second season, where she became the 15th contestant eliminated.

In 2015, she received a job offer in Chile to work as a promoter. Upon returning to Argentina, she participated in the fourth season of Combate where she was eliminated after 67 days. During the fifth season, she reached the finals but wasn't able to win them.

In 2016, she participated in the sixth season where she reached the finals but again failed to win the final. During the seventh season, after a disagreement with her rival, Flor Vigna, she became the captain of the Green Team. Shortly before the end of the season, Viciconte and her then partner decided to leave the show, causing a stir among the show's fanbase. Later, the public voted for her to re-enter the program, and she was awarded winner along with her team.

In 2018, in her last season of Combate, she again was titled "Absolute Champion". She also participated in Bailando 2018, where she eliminated Benjamín Alfonso, Cinthia Fernández, Diego Ramos and Lourdes Sánchez, being finally eliminated by Julián Serrano and Sofía Morandi in the semifinal. She was a panelist on Incorrect afterwards.

In May 2020, she announced that she was joining the panel of El show del problema, after leaving Incorrectas after it went off the air. In addition, she served as a panelist on Pampita Online, and currently she is on the show She Is In Your Hands..

Other pursuits 
She made her film debut playing Anna in Bathrooms 5: Slow and Loady.

Personal life 
She is currently the partner of the soccer player and businessman Fabián Cubero.

Filmography

Paltaform digital

Cinema

Theater

Radio

Awards and nominations

References

External links 

 
 

Argentine sportswomen
Bailando por un Sueño (Argentine TV series) participants
1989 births
Living people